Ziddi ("Stubborn") is a 1948 Bollywood film directed by Shaheed Latif. It was based on a story written by Ismat Chughtai. The film helped establish its actors Dev Anand, Kamini Kaushal and Pran in Hindi films.

The playback singers Lata Mangeshkar and Kishore Kumar recorded their first duet "Yeh Kaun Aaya Re" together in Ziddi.

Cast
 Dev Anand as Puran 
 Kamini Kaushal as Asha
 Pran
 Nawab
 Kuldeep Kaur as Shanta
 Chandabai

Music

                 
The music of the film was composed by Khemchand Prakash.

The soundtrack featured the first film song sung by singer Kishore Kumar, "Marne Ki Duaen Kyon Mangun", a solo picturised on Dev Anand. The film also included Lata Mangeshkar's solo, "Chanda Re Ja Re Ja, Piya Se Sandesa Mora Kahiyo Ja", picturised on Kamini Kaushal.

References

External links 
 

1948 films
1940s Hindi-language films
1948 directorial debut films
Films scored by Khemchand Prakash
Indian drama films
1948 drama films
Indian black-and-white films
Hindi-language drama films